Carl Eneas Sjöstrand (11 September 1828 – 14 February 1906) was a Swedish sculptor who worked for over 40 years in the Grand Duchy of Finland.

Biography
Sjöstrand was born at Stockholm, Sweden. He was the son of painter Carl Johan Sjöstrand (1789-1857) and his wife Johanna Sofia Morberg. He first trained at the Royal Swedish Academy of Fine Arts with Carl Gustaf Qvarnström (1810-1867). In the 1850s, he studied at the Royal Danish Academy of Fine Arts in Copenhagen and as a private student with sculptor Herman Wilhelm Bissen (1798–1868).

Sjöstrand first arrived in Finland in the autumn of 1856 where he worked on the statue of Henrik Gabriel Porthan (1739–1804) in Turku. After working in Stockholm in 1861–1862, in 1863 Sjöstrand was offered a position as instructor at the Academy of Fine Arts, Helsinki by Fredrik Cygnaeus (1807–1881). Sjöstrand was a teacher in Finland for a total of 18 years. Among his students was the Finnish sculptor Walter Runeberg (1838–1920). Sjöstrand is considered to have been the founder of Finnish sculpture because of his role as a promoter of Finnish public sculpture in the 1850s and 60s, and his interpretations of Finnish themes.

Personal life
Carl Eneas Sjöstrand was married to Herminie von Stahl. He was the father of the painter Helmi Sjöstrand (1864-1957) and of Gerda Sjöstrand (1862-1956), who married the Italian composer Ferruccio Busoni. Sjöstrand lived in Finland from 1863 until 1904. His wife died in 1884. He died in Stockholm during 1906 and was buried in the Hietaniemi Cemetery in Helsinki.

Notable works

Notes

External links
Biography in English
Biography

1828 births
1906 deaths
Swedish male sculptors
Artists from Stockholm
Royal Danish Academy of Fine Arts alumni
Burials at Hietaniemi Cemetery
20th-century Finnish sculptors
19th-century Finnish sculptors
20th-century Swedish sculptors
19th-century Swedish sculptors
Swedish expatriates in Finland
19th-century Swedish male artists